Matthew W. McKeon is the chair of the philosophy department at Michigan State University and well known philosopher of logic. McKeon earned his Ph.D. in philosophy at The University of Connecticut in 1994. He teaches courses in Logic and Philosophy of Language.

Contributions to philosophy
McKeon's work primarily focuses on Logic and Philosophy of Language, Metaphysics, Epistemology, History of Early Twentieth Century Analytic Philosophy, and Philosophy of Mathematics.

Professional publications

He has published numerous peer-reviewed articles in journals such as Synthese, Journal of Philosophical Logic,  and History and Philosophy of Logic. He also published the book The Concept of Logical Consequence (American University Studies V: Philosophy) in 2010.

Awards and distinctions
McKeon was a participant in the NEH Summer Seminar, "Proofs and Refutations in Mathematics Today," from June 25 to August 3 of 2001 at Case Western Reserve University and was awarded an IRGP (MSU intramural) grant  in 2003.

Selected works

 “On the Substitutional Characterization of First-Order Logical Truth, ” New York: Lang Publishing(2010)
 “A Plea for Logical Objects,” Synthese 167, 163-182 (2009).
 “A Defense of the Kripkean Account of Logical Truth in First-Order Modal Logic,” Journal of Philosophical Logic 34, 305-326 (2005).
 “On The Substitutional Approach to Logical Consequence” 411-446 in Mistakes of Reasoning: Essays in Honour of John Woods. Ed. A. Irvine and K. Peacocke. Toronto: University of Toronto Press, (2005).
 “Logic and Existential Commitment,” Logique et Analyse 47, 409-423 (2004).
 “On the Substitutional Characterization of First-Order Logical Truth, ” History and Philosophy of Logic 25, 195-214 (2004).
 “Models, Validity, and Possible Worlds,” 153-166 in Logical Consequence: Rival Approaches. Ed. by J. Woods and B. Brown. Oxford: Hermes Science Publishing Ltd., (2001).
 “Bertrand Russell and Logical Truth,” Philosophia 27, 481-493 (1999).

See also
 American Philosophy
 American Philosophers
 Logical consequence
 Logical truth

References 

Living people
University of Connecticut alumni
Michigan State University faculty
Philosophers of logic
American logicians
Philosophers of language
21st-century American philosophers
20th-century American philosophers
Metaphysicians
Epistemologists
Year of birth missing (living people)